The 1962 CFL season is considered to be the ninth season in modern-day Canadian football, although it is officially the fifth Canadian Football League season.

CFL News in 1962
The Canadian Football Hall of Fame was established in Hamilton.

The 50th Grey Cup game, nicknamed "The Fog Bowl", was postponed due to fog on Saturday, December 1.  The final 9 minutes and 29 seconds was played on Sunday as the Winnipeg Blue Bombers defeated the Hamilton Tiger-Cats, 28–27 to win their third championship in four years.

This was the most recent CFL season with average attendance of under 20,000 spectators per game.

Regular season standings

Final regular season standings
Note: GP = Games Played, W = Wins, L = Losses, T = Ties, PF = Points For, PA = Points Against, Pts = Points

Bold text means that they have clinched the playoffs.
 Winnipeg and Hamilton have first round byes.

Grey Cup playoffs
Note: All dates in 1962

Conference Semi-Finals

Conference Finals

Playoff bracket

Grey Cup Championship

CFL Leaders
 CFL Passing Leaders
 CFL Rushing Leaders
 CFL Receiving Leaders

1962 CFL All-Stars

Offence
QB – Eagle Day, Calgary Stampeders
RB – Earl Lunsford, Calgary Stampeders
RB – George Dixon, Montreal Alouettes
RB – Leo Lewis, Winnipeg Blue Bombers
RB – Ray Purdin, Saskatchewan Roughriders
OE – Hal Patterson, Hamilton Tiger-Cats
OE – Tommy Joe Coffey, Edmonton Eskimos
C – Neil Habig, Saskatchewan Roughriders
OG – Tony Pajaczkowski, Calgary Stampeders
OG – Gerry Patrick, Toronto Argonauts
OT – Frank Rigney, Winnipeg Blue Bombers
OT – Bronko Nagurski Jr., Hamilton Tiger-Cats

Defence
DT – Don Luzzi, Calgary Stampeders
DT – John Barrow, Hamilton Tiger-Cats
DE – Garner Ekstran, Saskatchewan Roughriders
DE – Herb Gray, Winnipeg Blue Bombers
MG – Kaye Vaughan, Ottawa Rough Riders
LB – Wayne Harris, Calgary Stampeders
LB – Tom Brown, BC Lions
LB – Gord Rowland, Winnipeg Blue Bombers
LB – Jim Conroy, Ottawa Rough Riders
DB – Harvey Wylie, Calgary Stampeders
DB – Don Sutherin, Hamilton Tiger-Cats
S – Jim Rountree, Toronto Argonauts

1962 Eastern All-Stars

Offence
QB – Russ Jackson, Ottawa Rough Riders
RB – Dick Shatto, Toronto Argonauts
RB – George Dixon, Montreal Alouettes
RB – Ernie White, Ottawa Rough Riders
F – Bobby Kuntz, Hamilton Tiger-Cats
OE – Hal Patterson, Hamilton Tiger-Cats
OE – Marv Luster, Montreal Alouettes
C – Ron Watton, Hamilton Tiger-Cats
OG – Hardiman Cureton, Hamilton Tiger-Cats
OG – Ellison Kelly, Hamilton Tiger-Cats
OT – Moe Racine, Ottawa Rough Riders
OT – Bronko Nagurski Jr., Hamilton Tiger-Cats

Defence
DT – John Barrow, Hamilton Tiger-Cats
DT – Bobby Jack Oliver, Montreal Alouettes
DE – Billy Ray Locklin, Montreal Alouettes
DE – Mel Semenko, Ottawa Rough Riders
MG – Kaye Vaughan, Ottawa Rough Riders
LB – Zeno Karcz, Hamilton Tiger-Cats
LB – Jim Andreotti, Toronto Argonauts
LB – Ed Nickla, Montreal Alouettes
LB – Jim Conroy, Ottawa Rough Riders
DB – Joe Poirier, Ottawa Rough Riders
DB – Don Sutherin, Hamilton Tiger-Cats
S – Jim Rountree, Toronto Argonauts

1962 Western All-Stars

Offence
QB – Eagle Day, Calgary Stampeders
RB – Earl Lunsford, Calgary Stampeders
RB – Nub Beamer, BC Lions
RB – Leo Lewis, Winnipeg Blue Bombers
RB – Ray Purdin, Saskatchewan Roughriders
OE – Pete Manning, Calgary Stampeders
OE – Tommy Joe Coffey, Edmonton Eskimos
C – Neil Habig, Saskatchewan Roughriders
OG – Tony Pajaczkowski, Calgary Stampeders
OG – Sherwyn Thorson, Winnipeg Blue Bombers
OT – Frank Rigney, Winnipeg Blue Bombers
OT – Lonnie Dennis, BC Lions

Defence
DT – Don Luzzi, Calgary Stampeders
DT – Roger Savoie, Winnipeg Blue Bombers
DE – Garner Ekstran, Saskatchewan Roughriders
DE – Herb Gray, Winnipeg Blue Bombers
MG – Ron Atchison, Saskatchewan Roughriders
LB – Wayne Harris, Calgary Stampeders
LB – Tom Brown, BC Lions
LB – Gord Rowland, Winnipeg Blue Bombers
LB – Bill Burrell, Saskatchewan Roughriders
DB – Oscar Kruger, Edmonton Eskimos
DB – Dick Thornton, Winnipeg Blue Bombers
S – Harvey Wylie, Calgary Stampeders

1962 CFL Awards
 CFL's Most Outstanding Player Award – George Dixon (RB), Montreal Alouettes
 CFL's Most Outstanding Canadian Award – Harvey Wylie (DB), Calgary Stampeders
 CFL's Most Outstanding Lineman Award – John Barrow (DT), Hamilton Tiger-Cats
 CFL's Coach of the Year – Steve Owen, Saskatchewan Roughriders
 Jeff Russel Memorial Trophy (Eastern MVP) – George Dixon (RB), Montreal Alouettes
 Jeff Nicklin Memorial Trophy (Western MVP) - Eagle Day (QB), Calgary Stampeders
 Gruen Trophy (Eastern Rookie of the Year) - Whit Tucker (WR), Ottawa Rough Riders
 Dr. Beattie Martin Trophy (Western Rookie of the Year) - Ted Frechette (DB/RB), Edmonton Eskimos
 DeMarco–Becket Memorial Trophy (Western Outstanding Lineman) - Tom Brown (LB), BC Lions

References 

Canadian Football League seasons
CFL